Chyňava is a municipality and village in Beroun District in the Central Bohemian Region of the Czech Republic. It has about 1,800 inhabitants.

Administrative parts
Villages of Lhotka u Berouna, Libečov, Malé Přílepy and Podkozí are administrative parts of Chyňava.

Geography
It lies in the Křivoklát Highlands. The Loděnice River flows along the municipal border.

History
The first written mention of Chyňava is from 1341. From 1357 to 1585, the village was part of the Karlštejn estate and shared its owners and destiny. During the Hussite Wars, Chyňava suffered and the population decreased. From 1585, Chyňava belonged to the Křivoklát estate. During the Thirty Years' War, Chyňava was heavily damaged and the population decreased significantly again, but the village slowly recovered.

Sights
The landmark of Chyňava is the Church of Saint Procopius. It was originally a medieval church, which was rebuilt in the Baroque style in 1779–1782 and then in the neo-Baroque style in 1914.

Twin towns – sister cities

Chyňava is twinned with:
 Ledro, Italy

References

External links

Villages in the Beroun District
Populated places in the Beroun District